Stanley Thomas Hahn (9 June 1945 – 28 January 1991) was an English cricketer.  Hahn was a right-handed batsman who fielded as a wicket-keeper.  He was born in Watford, Hertfordshire.

Hahn made his debut for Oxfordshire in the 1964 Minor Counties Championship against Dorset.  Hahn played Minor counties cricket for Oxfordshire from 1964 to 1972 which included 34 Minor Counties Championship matches.  He made his List A debut against Worcestershire in the 1970 Gillette Cup.  In this match he scored 25 runs before being run out.  He played a further List A match against Durham in the 1972 Gillette Cup.  In his second match, he scored 3 runs before being dismissed by Stuart Young.

Stan Hahn was also a very fine table tennis player who represented both Oxfordshire and Buckinghamshire.  He was the leading player in Oxford in 1965, 1967, 1971 to 1974 and again in 1976 and 1977.  Hahn also forged a formidable doubles partnership, and won many titles, with his long-time team-mate, David Harse ("Harry"). Hahn had a fine all-round game and could defend away from the table with the best of them.  However, he was probably happiest when deploying his imaginatively varied, unerringly consistent and pitilessly accurate loops to put his opponents on the defensive.  As well as his dominating forehand loop, he was among the first practitioners of the backhand loop, probably the hardest shot in the game.  His matchless powers of concentration meant that, although his style demanded the greatest precision, he seldom missed.
Though his competitive drive sometimes spilled over into unnerving displays of fury, he played the game fairly and he encouraged many youngsters, who found him to be an approachable and inspiring champion of the game.

He died in Oxford, Oxfordshire on 28 January 1991.

References

External links
Stanley Hahn at ESPNcricinfo
Stanley Hahn at CricketArchive

1945 births
1991 deaths
Sportspeople from Watford
English cricketers
Oxfordshire cricketers
Wicket-keepers